Young Hunting is an American, Los Angeles-based dream pop, indie band, featuring members: Hari Rex (vocals/guitar), Ilya Mxx (vocals/guitar), Patrick Taylor (bass), and Miles Senzaki (drums). They are signed with Gold Robot Records and have released their second album. A couple of the band's members also played with The Pharcyde and Syl Johnson.

Discography
 2019: True Believers (LP)
 2013: Hazel (LP)
 2010: "Into yr Mind" (Single)
 2010: "Sonata" (Single)

References

Dream pop musical groups
Indie pop groups from Los Angeles
Musical quartets